The Little Knife River (West) is a  river in St. Louis County, Minnesota, United States. It is a tributary of the Knife River. A second Little Knife River flows into the Knife River from the east, in Lake County.

See also
List of rivers of Minnesota

References

Minnesota Watersheds
USGS Hydrologic Unit Map - State of Minnesota (1974)

Rivers of Minnesota
Rivers of St. Louis County, Minnesota
Tributaries of Lake Superior